Stella Hjaltadóttir (born 23 June 1967) is an Icelandic cross-country skier and former football player.

Cross country skiing
Stella won a national championship in cross-country skiing in 1988, 1999, 2008 og 2013.

Football

Club
Stella played 78 games with ÍBÍ, KA and Valur in Úrvalsdeild kvenna from 1984 to 1993. She won the 2. deild kvenna with Boltafélag Ísafjarðar in 1989.

International
Stella was selected to the Icelandic national football team ahead of two games against West Germany in Delmenhorst in September 1987. She was an unused substitute in the first game on September 4 but played all 90 minutes in the second game on September 6 when West Germany won 3–2.

Career statistics

References:

Personal life
Stella is the mother of the Icelandic cross-country skier Dagur Benediktsson.

References

External links

1967 births
Living people
Stella Hjaltadottir
Stella Hjaltadottir
Stella Hjaltadottir
Stella Hjaltadottir
Stella Hjaltadottir
Stella Hjaltadottir
Stella Hjaltadottir
Women's association football defenders
20th-century Icelandic women